AudioBoom PLC is an on-demand audio and podcasting distribution platform. AudioBoom offers business-to-business services to the radio, media and podcast industries.

AudioBoom's platform has been used to power on-demand audio for businesses including BBC, The Spectator Associated Press, NBC Sports, Yahoo!, Cumulus Media and Westwood One.

The company is based in London with offices in New York, Melbourne and Mumbai. It became AIM-listed on the London Stock Exchange in 2014 as Audioboom Group Limited (AIM: BOOM).

History
The company was founded in 2009 as Audioboo Limited. The main shareholders were UBC Media Group and Slovar Limited. In 2014 they sold their shares in a reverse takeover to the listed company One Delta plc., changing the name of the latter to Audioboom Group plc (AIM symbol BOOM).

The AudioBoom mobile app was discontinued in May 2019.

Features
AudioBoom provides hosting, publishing, distribution and monetization services for on-demand content. Key features include:
 Unlimited audio hosting on branded content channels through a publisher dashboard
 Automated distribution through partnerships with Apple Podcasts, CastBox, Deezer, Google Podcasts, iHeart, RadioPublic, Spotify, Stitcher and TuneIn.
 Embeddable media players
 Advanced analytics and consumption data
 Monetization through podcast sponsorships and a built-in ad network

Key users and partners
Russell Brand's podcast series, featuring Matt Morgan and resident poet Mr. Gee, launched exclusively on audioBoom in February 2015 and ended in May 2015.
Cumulus Media publish on-demand content from over 450 of their radio stations.
Westwood One provide ad-sales services and distribute major syndicated radio shows through the platform.
Associated Press distribute hourly news updates to their partner websites using AudioBoom.
Zee TV post entertainment, news and general interest content across their Zee, DNAIndia and Ditto brands.
Kidd Kraddick In The Morning show joined in January 2013 and became the most popular channel on the platform.
The Guardian used the apps to liveblog news and gather reactions, including from the Gaza Strip and from the site of the Boston Marathon bombing.
Yahoo! Sports Radio host their Podcast Arena shows.
BBC Radio, including radios 2, 4 and 6, a number of local radio stations, and several World Service non-English language stations.
The Premier League joined in late 2013, hosting its podcast and promoting the use of audioBoom among Premier League clubs.
Stephen Fry recorded a welcome message which was sent to all new users.

Alternatives
 SoundCloud

References

Podcasting companies
IOS software
Android (operating system) software